Beiji qianjin yaofang, literally Essential Formulas Worth a Thousand in Gold for Emergencies, is a Chinese medical text by Sun Simiao first published in 652. A sequel was published in 682.

Contents
Comprising thirty juan or scrolls, the text is primarily focused on medical disorders and their remedies. The introduction discusses medical diagnosis and treatment, while laying out a moral code for physicians. The remaining twenty-nine juan pertain to, among other things, gynaecology; "wind-induced disorders"; diseases experienced by women and children; "disorders of the seven orifices"; disorders of qi; "cold damage disorders"; "wasting thirst" and hemorrhoids; detoxification; acupuncture and moxibustion. 

Authorities cited in the text include Bian Que, Hua Tuo, Wang Shuhe, and Zhang Zhongjing. Uncharacteristically for medical texts of the time, Beiji qianjin yaofang also contains twenty-five case histories. 

According to the Zhongyao xueshi, the text has some 3,500 remedies, some of which involve a single drug, whereas others call for as many as sixty-four ingredients, most commonly ginseng, which is contained in 445 remedies. For instance, a certain "White Vetch Pill" that "triggers pregnancy" contains seventeen ingredients mixed with honey, including white vetch; ginseng; angelica; southern asarum; asarum; bull dodder; achyranthes; magnolia bark; pinellia; adenophora; dried ginger; infected silkworm; gentian; Sichuan pepper; aconite; saposhnikovia; and purple aster. Many of the remedies end with warnings such as "Do not transmit it even for a thousand in gold" and "Keep it secret".

Authorship
Beiji qianjin yaofang was written by Sun Simiao, one of the most renowned physicians in Chinese history. In the text's preface, Sun explains his motivations behind compiling thousands of remedies:

Publication history
The text was completed and first published in 652. A sequel, titled Qianjin yifang (literally Supplement to Formulas Worth a Thousand in Gold), was published in 682. Beiji qianjin yaofang and its sequel were reedited in the Song dynasty by civil servant Lin Yi and his colleagues at the Jiaozheng yishu ju (literally Bureau for Editing Medical Texts); both texts were republished in 1066.

See also
 List of nutrition guides
 List of sources of Chinese culinary history

References

Notes

Citations

Bibliography

 
 
 
 
 
 
 
 

Chinese medical texts
History of ancient medicine
7th-century Chinese books